Ruan is a Chinese surname.

The Cantonese version  is romanized Jyun2 in the Jyutping system or Yún in the Yale system, or more commonly Yuen or Un (the latter is typical in Macau). In Hokchew Chinese, it is Nguang.

Notable people named Ruan
 Ruan Zongze, Dr. Ruan served in the Chinese Embassy in the United States as Minister Counselor. Currently, he is Executive Vice President and a senior research fellow at CIIS. He is also editor-in-chief of the CIIS journal -China International Studies, and member of the UNDP Human Development Report Advisory Panel.
 Ruan Chengfa, a Chinese politician, governor of Yun Nan and Party secretary of Wu Han.
Ruan Yu, a literature writer during Han Dynasty (Chinese: 阮瑀; ?-212) 
Ruan Xiaoxu, a bibliography writer during North Southern and Northern Dynasties (Chinese: 阮孝緒; 479－536) 
Ruan Ji, is one of the Seven Sages of the Bamboo Grove (Chinese: 阮籍;210-263) 
Ruan Xian, a Chinese scholar who lived during the Six Dynasties period (Chinese: 阮咸;3rd century) 
Ruan Yuan, a scholar-official of renown in mid-Qing China prior to the Opium War (Chinese: 阮元, 1764-1849) 
Ruan Lingyu, 20th-century Chinese actress (阮玲玉, 1910-1935) 
Ruan Lufei, Chinese chess player (阮露斐, b. 1987) 
Ruan Xiaoqi, character in the novel Water Margin (阮小七) 
Ethan Juan, a Taiwanese actor
Wan Soon Bee, Singapore politician and businessman.
Kitty Yuen, Hong Kong entertainer
Louis Yuen Siu-cheung, Hong Kong actor
 John Ruan, an American businessman and founder of Ruan Transportation
Yongbin Ruan (born 1953), Chinese mathematician
Xinbo Ruan, Chinese engineer

See also
Nguyễn
Ng (surname)

Chinese-language surnames
Individual Chinese surnames